Agustín Suárez (born 1 May 1997) is an Argentine professional footballer who plays as a defender for General Lamadrid.

Career
Suárez appeared for Kimberley in the 2015 Torneo Federal B campaign, making one appearance as they qualified for the second phase of the tournament. Midway through 2017–18, Suárez began featuring for Primera B Nacional's All Boys. He made three starts in February 2018, including for his bow on 2 February in an away draw to Independiente Rivadavia at the Estadio Bautista Gargantini.

Career statistics
.

References

External links

1997 births
Living people
Place of birth missing (living people)
Argentine footballers
Association football defenders
Primera Nacional players
Primera B Metropolitana players
Kimberley de Mar del Plata footballers
All Boys footballers
General Lamadrid footballers